Here Comes an Old Soldier from Botany Bay, commonly known as Here Comes an Old Soldier or just Old Soldier, is a nursery rhyme and children's game found in Australia, the United States, and the British Isles. The game and rhyme date to at least the late nineteenth century.

Lyrics 

Here comes an old soldier from Botany Bay,
Have you got anything to give him to-day.

When the words are incorporated into a game by children, a caller delivers the lines and the first person responding names the item he will give. The caller then repeats the lines and the next person adds his gift to the one already named; the process is then repeated until there is a long list that has to be remembered. For example:
Caller: Here comes an old soldier from Botany Bay,
Have you got anything to give him to-day?
First person: I'll give him a hat.
Caller: Here comes an old soldier from Botany Bay,
Have you got anything to give him to-day?
Second person: I'll give him a hat and a dog.
Caller: Here comes an old soldier from Botany Bay,
Have you got anything to give him to-day?
Next person: I'll give him a hat, a dog and a meat pie...
- And so on until the list is so long no one can remember it.

Origin and variations 
G. K. Chesterton wrote of the poem as a "beggars' rhyme" during his childhood in late nineteenth-century London, and quoted the words as thus:

Here comes a poor soldier from Botany Bay:
What have you got to give him to-day?

Mentions of children's games in the late 19th century indicate a variation involving the prohibition of predetermined taboo words. The words forbidden are typically 'Yes', 'No', 'Black, 'White', and sometimes other colours. The child playing the soldier may beg items of clothing and then ask what colours they are, or otherwise enter into a conversation in the hope that the child questioned will forget what has been agreed, in which case they must pay a forfeit.

Various other games incorporating the rhyme emerged in the twentieth century, most local adaptations that replaced the "old soldier from Botany Bay" with an "old woman from Botany Bay."

See also
 I packed my bag, a similar word game

References 

Songs about soldiers
Children's games
Australian nursery rhymes
English nursery rhymes
Australian children's songs
English children's songs
Traditional children's songs
Fictional soldiers
Songs about the military
Memory games